Marquand Park is a  arboretum and recreational area located in Princeton, New Jersey.  It contains walking paths, a baseball field, and attractions for children such as a sandbox and a play structure.

History

Marquand Park was originally the property of the Princeton University professor Judge Richard Field, who bought  of farmland in 1842 for his personal estate.  Field began developing part of the estate as an arboretum, and after he died, its development continued under Susan Brown, who acquired the land in 1871, and under Princeton University Professor Allan Marquand, who acquired the property in 1885.

In 1953,  of the land were given to Princeton borough by the Marquand family, and in 1955 a non-profit foundation was created to care for the park.  Under the care of the Marquand Park Foundation, over 100 new species and trees of shrubs have been donated to the park or purchased by the foundation for it.

Notable trees

Eight of the largest trees of their species recorded in New Jersey can be found in the park.  Other well-known trees there include a dawn redwood, a critically endangered species which was thought to be extinct until a specimen was discovered in Japan in 1945, and a threadleaf Japanese Maple, which is well known for the corkscrew-like shape of its trunk and branches.  (Photographs of the Japanese Maple can be found here.)

References

Zatz, Arline. New Jersey's Great Gardens. Woodstock, Vermont: The Countryman Press, 1999.
Compton, Dorothy and Ramsay L. Raymond. A Guide to Marquand Park. Princeton, New Jersey: Minute Press, 1972.
Richie, Peter. Marquand Park. Princeton, New Jersey: Minute Press, 1989.
Princeton Township - Marquand Park
Marquand Park in Princeton, NJ - Kids Play Parks

External links
Official website

Princeton, New Jersey
Parks in Mercer County, New Jersey
Historic district contributing properties in Mercer County, New Jersey